Alexander Campbell (1770 – January 18, 1834) was a farmer and political figure in Upper Canada.

He was born in New York state in 1770. His father(?) served with Edward Jessup's Loyal Rangers during the American Revolution and settled in Edwardsburgh Township in Upper Canada after the war. He was a justice of the peace in the Johnstown District, a registrar for the Eastern District and represented Dundas in the 1st Parliament of Upper Canada. He was Sir John A Macdonald's partner as well as friend.

He died in Edwardsburgh Township in 1834.

References 
Becoming Prominent: Leadership in Upper Canada, 1791–1841, J.K. Johnson (1989)

1770 births
1834 deaths
Members of the Legislative Assembly of Upper Canada
People from Leeds and Grenville United Counties
Canadian people of Scottish descent
Canadian justices of the peace